Paratecoma is a genus of flowering plants belonging to the family Bignoniaceae.

Its native range is Southeastern Brazil.

Species
Species:
 Paratecoma peroba (Record) Kuhlm.

References

Bignoniaceae
Bignoniaceae genera